Terry Hanson (born June 16, 1947) is a retired American radio personality of the John Boy and Billy Big Show, a nationally syndicated radio show.  He was the first head of the Turner Broadcasting Sports and a National Association of Intercollegiate Athletics (NAIA) National Men's Soccer Coach of the Year.  He has also owned and operated the Charlotte, North Carolina-based Hanson Enterprises since 1994.

Biography
Hanson was born in East St. Louis, Illinois, on June 16, 1947. He earned a bachelor's degree in education from St. Benedict's College (now Benedictine College) in Atchison, Kansas, in 1968; two years later, in 1970, Hanson earned his master's degree in education from Southeast Missouri State University in Cape Girardeau, Missouri. After this, he began his professional career at Benedictine College in Atchison, Kansas, where he was the head coach in both soccer and baseball, and he was named the National Soccer Coach of the Year in 1974 by the NAIA.

Hanson spent four summers as an associate scout for two major league baseball teams: the Philadelphia Phillies and the San Diego Padres. He also spent five seasons as a senior executive for three North American Soccer League (1968–1984) teams: the Rochester Lancers, the Washington Diplomats, and the Atlanta Chiefs.

From 1980 to 1984, Hanson worked as a Turner Sports executive. In 1982, Hanson, Robert Wussler, and Russ Potts successfully outbid CBS to air what was dubbed "The Game of the Decade" on Turner Network Television—a college basketball game pitting The University of Virginia against the Georgetown Hoyas in a matchup which featured the two biggest stars in college basketball at the time, Ralph Sampson and Patrick Ewing. This was an important step for sports broadcasting on cable television, as high-profile sporting event broadcasts had always been featured on major networks prior to this. it was also the first use of the name "Turner Network Television" (or TNT).

In an article in The Sporting News in May 2017, there is an article outlining the genesis of Ted Turner's idea to have Hanson and Robert Wussler create a four-hour baseball documentary on what typically happens during any baseball season. This Emmy and Ace Award-winning documentary followed the 1982 season of the Turner-owned Atlanta Braves. It was entitled  “It’s A Long Way to October” and was narrated by legendary baseball announcer Red Barber, produced by Glenn Diamond and Hanson was the Executive Producer.

From 1984 to 1991, Hanson was a PGA Tour executive serving as Director of Communications and Broadcasting.  He also negotiated network coverage.

Hanson was hired in 1991 to oversee the Raycom Sports events division, which included the Blockbuster Bowl and the Diet Pepsi Tournament of Champions, later titled by Harris Teeter, Food Lion and Hardee's, which was a high-profile college basketball tournament.

While with Hanson Enterprises, Terry and John Feinstein, long time friend and renowned sports author, commissioned a screen play of his best seller: Caddy For Life: The Bruce Edwards Story.  Hanson engaged The William Morris Agency, in conjunction with Matt Damon's and Ben Affleck's production company, LivePlanet. The work was eventually produced in documentary format for the Golf Channel.

Since 2007, Hanson had been a regular ensemble member on The John Boy and Billy Big Show. He had also done television color analyst work in college basketball and professional soccer. He retired in January 2020, and moved to St. Louis, MO to be closer to his family.

Medical intervention
In 2005, Charlotte Observer writer Michael Gordon wrote an article titled, “Life, Death and Terry Hanson.” In the article, Gordon documents four separate times in Hanson's life when he was in the right place at the right time to come to a person's rescue:

1970—While Hanson was the baseball and soccer coach at St. Benedict's College in Atchison, Kansas, he performed mouth-to-mouth resuscitation on a retired Army officer, who had collapsed in front of Hanson's office.  At the age of 23, Hanson was unable to save his life.
1972—Hanson's friend, Ed Ireland, went missing on a Saturday night after closing the Knights of Columbus in Atchison, Kan with Hanson and friend Richard Dyer.  The following Monday, Hanson, Dyer and Ireland's brother went searching for their friend.  They stopped at every skid mark on a 20-mile stretch of highway.  By a stroke of luck, Dyer slipped down an embankment and spotted Ireland pinned underneath his car in the mud.
1991—Lloyd Cox, 86 at the time, collapsed at a baseball game.  Nearby, Hanson rushed over and performed CPR on Cox for ten minutes.  Afterward a paramedic told onlookers had Hanson not stepped into action, they would have watched Cox die.
2005—Hanson was at a lunch meeting with friend Andy Abdow, when Abdow collapsed at the restaurant from a heart attack.  Hanson performed mouth-to-mouth resuscitation while two other men assisted; Abdow was later stabilized by repeated shocks from a defibrillator at a hospital where he stayed for 15 days.

Retired
In January of 2020, he and his wife Patti retired to Eureka, Mo, a suburb of their native St Louis, to be near their children and grandchildren.

In December 2021, Hanson had a cornea transplant at Washington University to repair a long-standing eye issue called Keratoconus.

In May 2022 he was inducted into the St Louis Sports Hall of Fame in the category of Sports Administration and the induction consisted of an eleven-minute interview, that avoided speeches.

On September, 2022 Dan Caesar, sports media writer for the St Louis Post-Dispatch,  quoted Hanson on the national telecast of St louis Cardinals Albert Pujols hitting his 700th career Home Run. He was very critical of Major League Baseball airing that game exclusively on an Apple TV Friday Night Game of the Week. Hanson cited his disappointment that the exclusive telecast could not be seen by numerous Cardinals viewers who were not able to access the fee based Apple TV app.

References

1947 births
Living people
Benedictine Ravens baseball coaches
Benedictine College alumni
College men's soccer coaches in the United States
Southeast Missouri State University alumni
Sportspeople from East St. Louis, Illinois
American soccer coaches
North American Soccer League (1968–1984) commentators